Weary and Wired is the second album by guitarist and singer-songwriter Marc Ford. The album was released on March 27, 2007, on the Blues Bureau International label.

Track listing 
All songs written by Marc Ford, except as indicated.
 Featherweight Dreamland – 3:17
 Don't Come Around – 3:43
 It'll Be Over Soon – 3:07
 Dirty Girl – 3:05
 The Other Side (Ryan Bingham) – 2:53
 1000 Ways (Marc Ford, Elijah Ford) – 4:04
 Smoke Signals (Marc Ford, Luther Russell) – 8:26
 Greazy Chicken – 6:01
 Currents – 6:04
 Just Take the Money – 2:53
 Medicine Time – 4:05
 The Same Thing (Willie Dixon) – 8:44
 Running Man Blues – 2:44
 Bye Bye Suzy – 2:59
 The Big Callback – 3:29

Personnel
Marc Ford – vocals, guitars, backing vocals, record producer
Muddy (a.k.a. Mark Dutton) — bass guitar, backing vocals, co-producer
Doni Gray – drums, backing vocals

Additional musicians
Elijah Ford – bass guitar on "Featherweight Dreamland", 2nd guitar on "1000 Ways", backing vocals 
Mike Malone – Hammond organ, piano
Afton – organ on "Smoke Signals"
Aaron West – saxophone
Will Artope – trumpet

Additional background vocals
Chris Lizotte, Kirsten Ford, Scott Owen, Joel Owen

External links 
 
Marc Ford MySpace

2007 albums
Marc Ford albums